Rohn W. Bishop is the mayor of Waupun, Wisconsin and former Chairman of the Republican Party of Fond du Lac County. Bishop gained national notoriety for criticizing then-President of the United States Donald Trump during the 2020 Presidential Election.

Life 
Rohn W. Bishop was raised in Waupun, Wisconsin. He graduated from Waupun High School in 1998. He lives in Waupun with his wife and two daughters.

Civic Life 

Bishop first served on the City of Waupun Common Council from 2002 to 2009. He was reelected to the Alderman seat in 2021 intending to get back into municipal politics and run for mayor the next year. He was elected on April 5, 2022, and was sworn in on April 19, 2022.

Republican Party 
Bishop became involved with the Republican Party of Fond du Lac County and became a member of the executive committee in 2009. He was the County Party treasurer from 2011 to 2017, and chairman from 2017 to 2021 before stepping down to run for Mayor of Waupun.

In 2014, Bishop ran for election to the office of Wisconsin Secretary of State as a Republican but withdrew before the primary, endorsing fellow Republican Julian Bradley in the race.

Political Views 
Bishop gained national notoriety during the 2020 United States presidential election for criticizing then-president Donald Trump's position on mail-in ballots and later the attempts to overturn the 2020 presidential election. In January 2022, Bishop was featured as one of the focus figures in The Steal: The Attempt to Overturn the 2020 Election and the People Who Stopped It.

Bishop is a member of the NRA and Wisconsin Farm Bureau.

References 

People from Waupun, Wisconsin
Wisconsin Republicans
1979 births
Living people